George Lockhart may refer to:

 Sir George Lockhart, Lord Carnwath (c. 1630–1689), Scottish lawyer and judge
 George Lockhart (footballer) (1877–?), Scottish footballer
 George Lockhart (politician) (1673–1731), Scottish writer, politician and spy
 George Lockhart of Tarbrax (died 1658), Commissioner for Glasgow in the Scottish Parliament
 George Claude Lockhart (1885–1979), ringmaster
 George Edward Lockhart (1902–1991), politician in Ontario, Canada
 George William Lockhart (1849–1904), elephant trainer

See also
 George Lockhart Rives
 George Lokert (1485–1547), Scottish philosopher